Acalypha ornata is a species in the botanical family Euphorbiaceae. In Africa it is widely used as a medicinal plant. The stems are used as fibres for weaving baskets. The leaves are eaten as a vegetable; the plants are also fed to domestic animals. Acalypha ornata is sometimes planted as an ornamental plant.

Geographic distribution 
Acalypha ornata occurs throughout tropical Africa, except most of West Africa and humid central Africa.

References 

All The Plants

External links 
PROTA4U on Acalypha ornata
 

ornata
Plants used in traditional African medicine
Leaf vegetables